Malcolm Irving Fages (born 5 December 1946) is a retired vice admiral in the United States Navy who served Deputy Chairman of the NATO Military Committee from 2001 to 2004.

A native of Jacksonville, Florida, Fages earned bachelor's degree in mechanical engineering from Auburn University. He later received a M.A. degree in political science from the University of Central Florida in 1990.

After serving on several submarines, Fages was given command of the nuclear submarine  and the gold crew of the ballistic missile submarine . He later served as commanding officer of Submarine Group Two.

References

1946 births
Living people
People from Jacksonville, Florida
Auburn University alumni
United States submarine commanders
University of Central Florida alumni
Recipients of the Meritorious Service Medal (United States)
Recipients of the Legion of Merit
Recipients of the Defense Superior Service Medal
United States Navy vice admirals